Zhenping County is a county in the south of Shaanxi province, China, and is the southernmost county-level division of the province. It is under the administration of the prefecture-level city of Ankang. In 2020 it had a population of 58,651.

It has a humid subtropical climate and mountainous landscape.

Administrative divisions 
As of 2019, Zhenping County is divided to 7 towns.
Towns

Climate

See also
 Forced abortion of Feng Jianmei

References

County-level divisions of Shaanxi
Ankang